Cem Can (born 1 April 1981 in Ankara, Turkey) is a Turkish football player who plays as a midfielder.

External links
 Profile at TFF.org
 Guardian Stats Centre

1981 births
Living people
Gençlerbirliği S.K. footballers
İstanbulspor footballers
MKE Ankaragücü footballers
Sivasspor footballers
Kayseri Erciyesspor footballers
Süper Lig players
Turkish footballers
Association football midfielders